Micreumenes is an Afrotropical genus of potter wasps with 30 described species.

Species
Micreumenes adelphus (Meade-Waldo, 1911)
Micreumenes annulipes (Cameron, 1910)
Micreumenes aterrimus (Giordani Soika, 1944)
Micreumenes basilewskyi (Giordani Soika, 1955)
Micreumenes brevicornis Gusenleitner, 2005
Micreumenes clypeolaris Giordani Soika, 1983
Micreumenes crassipunctatus Gusenleitner, 2000
Micreumenes curriei Ashmead, 1902
Micreumenes glaber Giordani Soika, 1983
Micreumenes guillarmodi Giordani Soika, 1983 
Micreumenes kelneri Giordani Soika, 1983
Micreumenes kenyaensis Gusenleitner, 2000
Micreumenes marci Gusenleitner, 2000
Micreumenes microspinae Gusenleitner, 2000
Micreumenes mozambicanus (Giordani Soika, 1944)
Micreumenes mutarensis Gusenleitner, 2002
Micreumenes natalensis (de Saussure, 1855)
Micreumenes nigerrimus Gusenleitner, 2000
Micreumenes nigrorufus Giordani Soika, 1989
Micreumenes notabilis Giordani Soika, 1983
Micreumenes obscurus Gusenleitner, 2000
Micreumenes perversus Giordani Soika, 1989
Micreumenes petri Gusenleitner, 2000
Micreumenes ruficlypeus Gusenleitner, 1998
Micreumenes rufipes (Cameron, 1905)
Micreumenes separandus Gusenleitner, 2002
Micreumenes snellingi Gusenleitner, 2002
Micreumenes subtilis Gusenleitner, 2007
Micreumenes voiensis Gusenleitner, 2000

References

Potter wasps
Hymenoptera genera